Doornkop is a 98% Black African village in Dr Kenneth Kaunda District Municipality, North West Province, South Africa. It is situated approximately 18 km north of Ventersdorp.

References

Populated places in the JB Marks Local Municipality